Olivier Rochus was the defending champion but lost in the semifinals.
David Goffin won the title, defeating Mischa Zverev 6–2, 6–2 in the final.

Seeds

Draw

Finals

Top half

Bottom half

References
 Main Draw
 Qualifying Draw

Orange Open Guadeloupe - Singles
2012 Singles